David L. Gosling is an academic supervisor in the University of Cambridge. He trained in nuclear physics and has held positions in the universities of Hull, Delhi (St. Stephen’s College), the East-West Center in Hawaii, and at the World Council of Churches in Geneva, where he was director of Church and Society.

From 2006-10 he was principal of Edwardes College in the University of Peshawar; he has taught in the Faculty of Education in the University of Cambridge, where he was also Spalding Fellow at Clare Hall College, Cambridge.

He is a Chartered Physicist (C Phys), a Fellow of the Royal Asiatic Society (FRAS), a Fellow of the International Society for Science and Religion (FISSR) and has published on ecological and scientific issues in south Asia, and on nuclear power. He was science consultant for the BBC Two Natural History series “Wonders of the Monsoon”.

Select publications

1939 births
Living people
Alumni of Fitzwilliam College, Cambridge
Fellows of Clare Hall, Cambridge
Academics of the University of Cambridge
British expatriates in Pakistan
Academic staff of the University of Peshawar